Richard Gerald Alfred Ashman (24 November 1899 – 15 May 1965) was a South African cricketer and cricket umpire. His umpiring career commenced in 1935 when he officiated in the second South Africa vs. Australia Test at Johannesburg in December. Ashman's fourteenth and final Test as umpire was in 1950.

In domestic first-class cricket, Ashman played six games as a wicket keeper for Orange Free State in the 1930s.

See also
List of Test cricket umpires

External links
 

1899 births
1965 deaths
People from Westminster
Free State cricketers
South African Test cricket umpires
South African cricketers